Senta Michelle Moses (born August 8, 1973) is an American actress. She is perhaps best known for her co-starring role as Phoebe,  the lab assistant in the children's series Beakman's World, Winnifred Leeds in General Hospital, Lizzie in Greek (2008-2009). Tracy McCallister in Home Alone (1990), & Home Alone 2: Lost in New York (1992)

Life and career
Moses was born on August 8, 1973, in Elmhurst, Illinois. She is of Italian and Lebanese descent.

She has been in show business since she was six months old appearing in a diaper commercial—which she refers to as "embarrassing".  She has since appeared in more than 100 national commercials—including ones for Teleflora, Wendy's and Toyota.

At age seven, she landed the role of Molly in the National Touring Company of Annie, appearing in 487 performances. While pursuing her high school diploma at the Chicago Academy for the Arts, Moses co-starred in the 1990 feature film Home Alone and its 1992 sequel, Home Alone 2: Lost in New York, as one of the older cousins of Kevin McCallister (Macaulay Culkin). After graduation at age 16, Moses moved to California to attend University of Southern California's School of Theatre.

Moses has appeared in the feature films Choose Connor, Can't Hardly Wait, D.C. Cab, Scream Queen, The Kiss, and Tequila Body Shots. Her television credits include Strong Medicine, The Education of Max Bickford, Everybody Loves Raymond, The Division, Touched by an Angel, and Party of Five has had recurring roles on My So-Called Life, Sister Sister, Greek and General Hospital. In 1993, Moses was a series regular on the NBC Saturday morning sitcom Running the Halls, the series lasted one season.

Moses was also in an improv troupe "Danger Danger". She currently lives in Los Angeles.

Personal life
Moses married television editor Joseph Mikan on July 19, 2015 in Burbank, California.

Filmography

References

External links

1973 births
Living people
20th-century American actresses
21st-century American actresses
Actresses from Illinois
American child actresses
American film actresses
American people of Italian descent
American people of Lebanese descent
American soap opera actresses
American stage actresses
American television actresses
USC School of Dramatic Arts alumni
People from Elmhurst, Illinois